Nenad Porges (born 27 December 1946 in Zagreb, Croatia) is a Croatian politician, businessman, entrepreneur and former Minister of Economy, Labour and Entrepreneurship.

Background and education
Porges was born in Zagreb to a Jewish family who came to Zagreb from Vienna and Bratislava. His paternal grandparents were killed during the Holocaust by the SS Prinz Eugen Division, while his father's life was spared due to a fact that he was an essential worker for the Third Reich. Porges received his degrees from the University of Zagreb (a bachelor's degree in economics and a master's degree in marketing) and was a lecturer in marketing and management in postgraduate studies at the Faculty of Economics of the University of Zagreb. He was the president of the Jewish community of Zagreb until 1993, when he retired  from the position. Porges remains a member, though inactive, of the Jewish community in Zagreb.

Political and business career
As a president of the Jewish community Zagreb, Porges was a strong advocate of Croatian independence. He directed a letter to the World Jewish Congress and all affiliated Jewish organizations and institutions with the title; "Appeal to our Jewish brothers and sisters". In the letter he appealed for the recognition of Croatia and support in the Croatian War for Independence which was  fought "against a brutal military force led by the Yugoslav Army". He served as adviser to the prime minister for two years. Prior to his post as adviser to the prime minister, Porges served as Deputy Minister of Economy, Labour and Entrepreneurship. In 1997 he became the Minister of Economy, Labour and Entrepreneurship in the Croatian Government. He has also worked on a number of marketing research projects and published numerous papers. In 2005 Porges was named among the one thousand most influential Croatians. After Croatian independence Porges helped to revive Freemasonry in the country.

External links
 by Leon Charney on The Leon Charney Report

References

1946 births
Living people
Businesspeople from Zagreb
Croatian Sephardi Jews
Croatian Democratic Union politicians
Jewish Croatian politicians
Faculty of Economics and Business, University of Zagreb alumni
Economy ministers of Croatia
Politicians from Zagreb
Croatian Freemasons
Croatian people of Austrian-Jewish descent
Croatian people of Slovak-Jewish descent